Janja Garnbret (born March 12, 1999) is a Slovenian rock climber and sport climber who has won multiple lead climbing and bouldering events at climbing competitions. In 2021, she became the first ever female Olympic gold medalist in sport climbing, and is widely regarded as one of the greatest competitive climbers of all time.  She is also the world's first-ever female climber to onsight an  graded sport climbing route. As of the end of 2022, Garnbret had won the most IFSC gold medals of any competitive climber in history.

Garnbret won her first international title in the lead competition at the 2014 World Youth B Championships. In July 2015, just after turning 16, she started competing in the senior category of the Lead Climbing World Cup. Since then, she participated in 42 Lead Climbing World Cup events, missing the podium in only four of them. In 2016, aged 17, Garnbret won the seasonal titles of the IFSC Climbing World Cup in lead and combined, World Championships in lead climbing, and World Youth A Championships in both lead climbing and bouldering. From 2016 to 2018, she was awarded the seasonal title in both lead climbing and combined disciplines. In both 2018 and 2019, she won the World Championships in bouldering and combined, and also reclaimed the lead title in 2019. The same year, Garnbret became the first athlete to win all bouldering World Cup events in a season.

Early life 
Garnbret started climbing at the age of seven, and first competed in the national competition at the age of eight. She won her first major competition at the 2013 European Youth Championships, where she won in bouldering.

Climbing career

Competitions
In 2015, her first year of eligibility for the IFSC Climbing World Cup, she placed seventh in the overall lead climbing standings. The same year, she also placed first in a Swedish bouldering event, the "La Sportiva Legends Only", ahead of Shauna Coxsey, Mélissa Le Nevé, Juliane Wurm, and Anna Stöhr. She also won the bouldering gathering Melloblocco in 2015.

In 2016, she won most of the IFSC competitions in which she participated. She won the World Cup in lead and combined disciplines, the World Championships in lead, and the World Youth Championships in lead and bouldering. Garnbret also won the Adidas Rockstars 2016 contest (an invitational contest for the world's best bouldering athletes), defeating Jessica Pilz in the superfinal. She also won Rock Master in 2016, and then again in 2018.

In 2017, she won the World Cup in lead and combined disciplines, the combined title in the European Championships, and ranked second in bouldering in the World Cup and the European Championships.

In 2018, she defended her World Cup titles in lead and combined disciplines and placed fourth in bouldering by winning two golds and one silver, after participating in just 3 out of 7 events (due to school commitments). Moreover, she won the World Championships in both bouldering and combined. She was close to also winning the Lead Climbing World Championships, where she earned the silver medal by topping the final route in 4 minutes and 38 seconds, just 11 seconds slower than Jessica Pilz, who won the Championship.

In 2019, she dominated the bouldering World Cup by solving 74 problems out of 78 and winning every event throughout the season. Throughout six events, she placed first in six qualifications, four semifinals and six finals. This feat had never been achieved before in the history of competition climbing. The same year, Garnbret won three out of four disciplines at the 2019 IFSC Climbing World Championships, taking gold in lead, bouldering, and combined. Her win in the combined event qualified her for a spot at the 2020 Summer Olympics.

In 2021, she began the 2021 IFSC Climbing World Cup season with a win in bouldering at Meiringen in April before finishing second in Salt Lake City, ending her streak of bouldering World Cup wins at nine. In the same year, she became the first ever female Olympic champion in sport climbing, taking gold in the women's combined event at the 2020 Summer Olympics.

In April 2022, after her first bouldering World Cup victory in the 2022 IFSC Climbing World Cup season at Meiringen, Garnbret announced that she would skip the remaining bouldering events to focus on the European Championships and the lead events of the World Cup. At the 2022 European Championships in Munich, Garnbret won gold in all three events – lead, bouldering, and combined – with the first two being the only titles she had never won before, thus completing the feat of winning every possible major title in sport climbing.

Rock climbing 

In 2015, Garnbret onsighted Avatar, an  route in Pandora, Croatia. The same year she successfully climbed her first , Miza za šest at Kotečnik in her home country of Slovenia. The next year she flashed La Fabelita in Santa Linya, an  sport climbing route. She was given advice by her countrywoman Mina Markovič and climbed the route in less than 15 minutes.

In 2017, she went one step further and clipped the anchor of her first , Seleccio Natural, in Santa Linya. Just a few days later she climbed her second 9a route, La Fabela pa la Enmienda, also in Santa Linya.

In November 2021, she onsighted Fish Eye with a confirmed grading of 8c in Oliana, Spain, which was the world's first-ever female onsight of an 8c route.

In March 2022, Garnbret made the first female ascent of Bügeleisen, an  problem in Maltatal, Austria.

Rankings

Climbing World Cup

Climbing World Championships 
Youth

Senior

Climbing European Championships 
Youth

Senior

World Cup podiums 
As of September 26, 2022, Garnbret has won 37 World Cup events and has a total of 56 podium finishes.

Lead

Bouldering

References

External links 

 
 

 
 
 
 

1999 births
Living people
Sportspeople from Slovenj Gradec
Female climbers
Slovenian rock climbers
World Games silver medalists
Competitors at the 2017 World Games
Sport climbers at the 2020 Summer Olympics
Olympic sport climbers of Slovenia
Olympic gold medalists for Slovenia
Olympic medalists in sport climbing
Medalists at the 2020 Summer Olympics
IFSC Climbing World Championships medalists
IFSC Climbing World Cup overall medalists
Boulder climbers